Ram ( Rām) is a figure in the Hebrew Bible. He is the son of Hezron and ancestor of David. His genealogical lineage and descendants are recorded in 1 Chronicles 2:9 and at the Book of Ruth 4:19. In the New Testament, his name is given as "Aram" and "Arni".

References

External links 

Tribe of Judah
Books of Chronicles people
Book of Ruth